Chili Weather is a 1963 Warner Bros. Merrie Melodies cartoon directed by Friz Freleng. The short was released on August 17, 1963, and stars Speedy Gonzales and Sylvester.

Plot
Some Mexican mice see the Guadalajara Food Processing Plant and try to enter but are prevented by Sylvester guarding the place. The hungry mice summon Speedy Gonzales to help them get food. Speedy steals some cheese, but when he goes back, Sylvester starts chasing him. They end up on a conveyor belt, where Sylvester gets shaved by some chopping blades. Speedy spreads some grease on a platform, and Sylvester skids into a vat of Tabasco Sauce. He melts a block of ice to recover. On another conveyor belt, Sylvester gets a bottle cap pressed onto his head. He pries it off with a bottle opener, but Speedy "yee-ha's" him into the ceiling where it gets stuck again, and Speedy hides his bottle opener. Sylvester wanders off, trying to club Speedy but unable to because of his lack of sight, and his aimless wandering lands him in a dehydrator. He emerges from the dehydrator in a miniature size (finally able to remove the bottle cap), but then Speedy, who is now larger than the cat, greets him prompting the tiny Sylvester to run away in fright.

Crew
Story: John Dunn
Animation: Gerry Chiniquy, Virgil Ross, Bob Matz, Lee Halpern, Art Leonardi
Layout: Hawley Pratt
Backgrounds: Tom O'Loughlin
Film Editor: Lee Gunther
Voice Characterizations: Mel Blanc
Music: Bill Lava
Produced by: David H. DePatie & Friz Freleng
Directed by: Friz Freleng

Home media
DVD- Looney Tunes Golden Collection: Volume 4

References

External links

1963 films
Merrie Melodies short films
1963 animated films
1963 comedy films
1963 short films
Short films directed by Friz Freleng
Animated films about cats
Animated films about mice
Films set in Mexico
Films scored by William Lava
1960s Warner Bros. animated short films
1960s English-language films
Speedy Gonzales films
Sylvester the Cat films